The 2017–18 Western Sydney Wanderers W-League season was their sixth season in the W-League, the premier competition for women's football in Australia. The team played home games both at Marconi Stadium and ANZ Stadium and the club was managed by Richard Byrne.

Players

Squad information

Transfers in

Transfers out

Contract extensions

Squad statistics

Competitions

W-League

League table

Results summary

Results by round

Fixtures
 Click here for season fixtures.

References

Western Sydney Wanderers FC (A-League Women) seasons
Western Sydney Wanderers